The following is a list of rules and variations from around the world, for the collection of games known as dodgeball.

Bombardment
Bombardment (also known as Pin Guard, Battle Ball, or Bombardo) is a game played with two teams in an inside gym (usually a basketball or netball court) divided into three roughly equal zones. Each team can roam freely in their own zone, or in the central no-man's land that divides their zones. If a player is hit with a ball, they are out. If a player catches a ball, the teammate who has been out for the longest time returns to the game (in some versions of bombardment, a player who catches the ball can bring back more players, or chose whom to return.), and the player who threw the ball is out. Deflecting a ball with a ball is allowed.
Bombardment is played with two teams each with pins and dodgeballs. The objective is to knock over all the opposing team's pins or eliminate all the players on the other team.  Players can get out by getting hit; however, it must be below the neck if playing with children.

Court variation 
If a player hits a basketball hoop's backboard on the other team's side then that team frees all eliminated players.

Other variations 
Another variation changes the purpose of the pins, in this variation it restores all the members of the opposing team.

Blob Ball

Blob Ball is a form of dodgeball similar to Blob Tag where when the person who is IT tags someone, they must grab on and follow them as if they were a blob. Once the blob reaches 6 people, they can split into two groups of 3 and so on. With Blob Ball, it's the same thing as blob tag except there's one person who is 'it' and when they hit someone, they must join hands and join the "Blob". The people in the blob who aren't the leader must follow the leader but can still pick up dodge balls and throw them, and if they hit someone the person who was hit must join the blob too. When the blob splits, a new leader is randomly chosen by the members of the blob.

In a variation, there is a defensive tactic. In these, if a player who is not in the blob hits with a ball, a player in the blob, that player is separated from the blob. The separated person will then join the person who hit them as their own 'good' blob, but the players in that blob may not tag people to get them to join unless they tag another player from the 'it' blob. The only way to separate people from the good blobs is to have someone from the 'it' blob hit them and then they rejoin the 'it' blob.

Courts & Revival
Courts & Revival are both Objectives.
List of courts:
Mixed, a mixed court is a court that is split into three. The bottom part only team 1 can be on, the top part only team 2 can be on, the middle part both teams can be on, but neither team can throw. They can catch and dodge, but not throw.
Sniper: A mixed court is a court that is split into six. The bottom part only team 1 can be on, the top part only team 2 can be on, the middle 4 parts both teams can be on, but neither team can throw. they can catch and dodge, but not throw.

List of Revive:
Backboard, if a player hits the backboard that is not on their side of the court, the player on their team that was out the longest amount of time comes back in. If that player gets it through the ring, then their whole team gets back in.
Team Fireball/Revenge: If you get out a player then a player gets you out then all the players that you got out get back in and you're out.
The Shield Player is invincible, however, if the whole team is out except him/her then the opposing team wins.

Doctor dodgeball
Doctor dodgeball (also known as dr. dodgeball, doctor dodge, doctor-doctor, hospital, or medic) involves a leader in each team, usually kept secret from each other, who tries to avoid getting hit. When players are hit, they fall to the ground and wait for their team's doctor to come and save them, which is usually done by the doctor touching the downed person. When the doctor saves the fallen player(s), they can get up and play again. The game ends when one team is entirely eliminated, which is very likely if a team loses their doctor. Another variation of the game ends as soon as the doctor is hit. Therefore, it is key for a team to pay attention in order to figure out who the enemy doctor is, and to protect their own. Some teams employ a "fake doctor" strategy to throw the opposing team off-guard as to who the doctor actually is, but in some games the doctor is known to both teams beforehand.

One variant's rules are altered so that when the doctor is killed, a new player becomes the doctor. A similar variation is king's court, which also involves a leader. If the leader is hit, the game is over. Sometimes used in conjunction with pins. Another variant uses a "hospital" in which "injured" players who are on the ground are dragged by players of either side back to the hospital which is at the rear of each team's playing area.  A patient brought back to the hospital is revitalized and allowed to continue playing, though if they are brought to the opposing team's hospital they are now playing for the other team.

Fireball
Fireball (also known as Family Style) is a variation of Dodgeball in which there are no teams. If a player has a ball then they are not allowed to move their feet. If a player throws a ball at another player, then the player they hit is out and all players they got out are in. There are many other variants with other rules. Fireball is very similar to No friends.

Team Fireball 
There are two teams and players can move while holding a ball. There may also be a line like in normal Dodgeball, or a limited amount of steps like in No friends.

Gaga

Gaga (also known as ga-ga, gagaball or octoball) is a form of dodgeball which is played within an octagonal enclosure when available, or in any other space that is completely enclosed by walls. The objective of the game is to eliminate one's opponents by hitting the ball with either an open hand or closed fist into the region at or below his or her knees. That player is then out and must leave the playing area. A player can also be eliminated by having his or her ball caught in the air. Touching the ball twice consecutively without the ball touching another player or the wall is grounds for elimination unless that player is attempting to catch the ball. Carrying, throwing, or catching the ball after a bounce also results in elimination. Hitting the ball out of bounds is grounds for elimination unless it is as the result of a defensive deflection. Pushing a player into the ball and making any other physical contact is also a violation. This and other matters of dispute are settled by the game's judges. There is only one ball in play at a time in gaga. The game is started either by placing the ball in the center of the octagon with each of the players touching the wall, or by bouncing the ball and repeating the word "ga" each time the ball touches the floor. After three bounces the ball is in play and the players may leave the wall. Any player touching the ball or leaving the wall before the third bounce is considered out. This is also the procedure for resuming the game after a stoppage of play. Stoppages of play result from the ball being hit out of bounds or the ball being caught. A player being hit at or below his or her knees is not grounds for a stoppage of play. The winner is the last player left in the playing area. The game can be played with a large group of people playing for themselves, in teams, or one on one.

Killerball
Killerball is a non-team variant, played especially in Sweden among children, such as in physical education classes. In the game, one must throw a soft, rubber ball at other players to "kill" them with a legal hit, sending them out of the game (often only temporarily).  The game is timed, the winner declared who finishes last.

All players are spread out in a gymnasium or other playing area. A ball is thrown into the air, and is taken up for throwing, after hitting the floor or a wall, by whoever gets to it first. It is then thrown at another player, and may be caught or picked up by any other player for successive throwing. A thrower must remain stationary after obtaining the ball, until the ball is thrown. A variation is to use more than one ball.

A player is "killed" by being struck by a ball, without catching it. Usually, a throw is "killing" only if a ball hits a player without hitting the floor or a wall first, but this rule is sometimes dropped.  Headshots are discouraged for safety reasons, and thus a hit on the head is not considered "killing". One may also catch a thrown ball with one's hands, and then one "kills" the thrower. In some rule variants, the hands are also considered shields, such that a hit on one or both hands, without a catch, does not "kill" the player who was hit.  A doubles variant using this rule, instead of catching, is to pair players up such that they must hold hands, each using their free hand to block throws, and to pick up and throw; the team of two is considered "killed" if either of them is "killed", or if they drop their mutual hand-hold.

"Killed" players are benched, waiting outside of the playing area (e.g., on an actual bench or a mat) until their "killer" has been "killed" in turn, at which point all players previously "killed" by that newly benched player may re-enter the game. There are several variations that require score-keeping of "kills": Each "killed" player is permitted back into the game after some amount of time has passed. Or all "killed" players can be periodically re-admitted at once, to keep the game going. Or positions on the bench may be limited, with the player benched the longest returning to the game when a newly "killed" player is benched; there might be four bench spots, or even just one.  Yet another variation is that a "killed" player sits down in the game area exactly where they were hit, and remains seated, acting as an obstacle, until they can get hold of a ball passing nearby, which frees them to stand and resume play. In a variation, a player who is killed moves to the sideline of the other team. This player, or "Ghost" must remain in the area and is allowed to catch and throw the ball at the opposing team.

The game continues until only one player remains, having "killed" all others, and thus requiring no score-keeping.  Or, for many of these variations, the game may be time-limited, and then the winner is the one who has "killed" the most players when the time is up; this requires score-keeping.

King's Court
Similar to normal Dodgeball, but if a player gets out then they move to the back of the opposing teams side. If a player on the opposing team's side gets a ball then they must throw it at one of the enemy players. If successful, they may go back to their original team.

Maram pitti

President
In President, each team decides one player to be the 'president'. If either president gets out, that president's team loses and the other team wins.

Protect the pin
Protect the pin (also known as P.T.P, dodgebowl, pin guard, poison pin, or pinball) is played like standard dodgeball, except that each team has plastic bowling pins (or any pin in general like tennis ball tins or cones) at the back of their side of the court (usually evenly spaced on the last line before the wall). Once knocked over, a pin must stay down. The game ends when all of a team's players are eliminated, or (more often) when all of a team's pins are knocked over. In this game, the balls may be used to hit players, hit pins, or block.  A caught ball brings in a teammate and eliminates the thrower.  Balls caught after making contact with the walls, floor, ceiling, pin, or anything aside from another player have no effect. This variation of dodgeball can be played in combination with other types of dodgeball, like doctor dodgeball.(Objective type is Win)

In some versions of protect the pin, players can have multiple (up to 3) lives.

In some versions of protect the pin, knocking over the pin can resurrect the thrower's whole team.

One variation of this involves only one pin per team, which is usually guarded by an appointed team member.  The game ends when one of the teams' pin is knocked down.

Prisonball

Prisonball (also known as doghouse dodgeball, prison dodgeball, prisoner dodgeball, battleball, Greek dodgeball, German dodgeball, teamball, crossfire, Swedish dodgeball, dungeon dodge, trench, jail dodgeball, jailball, jailbreak; king's court in Canada; queimada or queimado in Brazil; sniper in Japan; and Heaven in New Zealand) is played much like the original dodgeball game, except when a player is hit, he gets put in a defined area, the "prison", "jail", or "doghouse", behind the opposing team. To get out of prison, a trapped player must catch a ball thrown by a teammate. A player in prison may not eliminate anyone from the opposing team. "Prisoners" remain behind the opposing team until the game is over or they are released according to the current ruleset. In some versions of "prisonball" played on a basketball court, all players are released if a half-court shot is made into the opponent's basket.

In a variant called German prisonball (whether connected with Germany or not), the doghouse is extended to the sides of the opponent's court, as well as the back.  No one may be released from the doghouse; however, anyone in the doghouse is allowed to collect balls and attack the opposing team, provided they do not enter their court.  This makes for a hectic game since as players are eliminated, teams will eventually be attacked from all four sides.  The last team with a member remaining not in the doghouse wins.

It uses a single ball. Each team eventually has a player called their "king", who is the first on a team to go the jail zone, and returns to the main field when all teammates are in prison. The king has three lives, allowing for players to get back in. Völkerball is an official sport in the German gymnastics federation, played by women and girls.

Another version of prisonball is played by the YMCA in the United States.

Seven stones 

In seven stones (known by several other names in different regions of India), one team tries to throw a ball at a pile of seven stones to topple them, and then attempts to reconstruct the pile as fast as possible. The other team can throw the ball at the reconstructing team's players to eliminate them.

Spud 

The opponents run away from a designated player who tries to catch a ball thrown in the air and then throw it at one of them.

Trampoline dodgeball

This variant follows most normal dodgeball rules, but is played on a grid of trampolines and trampoline sidewalls. Players generally cannot be driven out of bounds, so gameplay options are reduced to hits and catches. The addition of trampolines makes the activity even more physically demanding than the regular game. It also allows for a wider range of jump plays as players bounce across several trampolines.

See also
 Dodgeball
 Dodgeball ranking
 U.S. intercollegiate dodgeball champions

References

Further reading
Keyes, A. (2005). The Complete Book About Dodgeball.  AuthorHouse. 
International Dodgeball Federation Rule Book (Variations starting on page 34) 
YMCA School Playground Partners: Dodgeball Games https://web.archive.org/web/20090219064408/http://ecke.ymca.org/docs/playgroundpartners/dodgeballgames.pdf

External links
 USA Dodgeball United States 501(c)(3) Governing Body of Dodgeball 
 World Dodgeball Federation 
 Elite Dodgeball 
 National College Dodgeball Association

Dodgeball
Ball games